The 94th Regiment of Foot was a British Army regiment formed in England in October 1780. It was placed on garrison duty in Jamaica in 1781 during the Anglo-Spanish War and then returned to England.  The regiment was disbanded in England in 1783.

References

External links

Infantry regiments of the British Army
Military units and formations disestablished in 1783